Kang Mi-suk may refer to:

 Kang Mi-suk (weightlifter) (born 1977), South Korean weightlifter
 Kang Mi-suk (curler) (born 1968), South Korean wheelchair curler